Nemophora ischnodesma is a moth of the family Adelidae or fairy longhorn moths. It was described by Edward Meyrick in 1928. It is found in India and western Malaysia.

References

Adelidae
Moths described in 1928
Moths of Asia
Moths of Malaysia